The Prince Charles Hospital (TPCH) is a major teaching and tertiary referral hospital in the northern suburb of Chermside in Brisbane, Australia. TPCH is a public hospital operated by Metro North Health, the largest health service in Queensland Health. The hospital is described to be the "leading cardiothoracic hospital in Australia", and provides services to patients in Queensland and northern New South Wales. The Prince Charles Hospital employs 3,390 staff, including 635 doctors and 2,150 nursing staff, and provides around 340,000 episodes of care each year. 

Beyond cardiothoracic care, The Prince Charles Hospital also provides general surgical and medical services, including both a paediatric and adult emergency medicine department, and specialist outpatient, rehabilitation, and palliative care services. The hospital is actively involved in medical research, and has research partnerships with the University of Queensland, the Queensland University of Technology, and the Australian Catholic University.

History 
The Brisbane Chest Hospital was opened in 1954 for the treatment of tuberculosis. Due to the success of prevention and treatment of tuberculosis, the hospital had space to treat a wider variety of patients and was renamed The Chermside Hospital in 1961 to reflect its more general healthcare role.

His Majesty, King Charles III, visited Brisbane in 1974 before he ascended to the throne ,the hospital was renamed The Prince Charles Hospital in his honour afterwards.

In 2007, a major upgrade of the hospital was completed and general medical and general surgical services have been introduced in a newly constructed building. The official opening ceremony was held the next day with the then Queensland Premier Peter Beattie as the chief guest. A new Intensive Care Unit and Emergency Department was also built.

Services 

The Prince Charles Hospital is the premier cardiac service for the whole of Queensland and northern New South Wales with services in complex interventional cardiology, structural heart disease, cardiac electrophysiology and adult congenital heart disease. It is the home of one of Australia's cardiac imaging programs. The Queensland Heart Failure and Transplant Unit (QHFTU) and the Indigenous Cardiac Outreach Program (ICOP) are based at The Prince Charles Hospital.

There is a heavy emphasis on teaching, with multiple daily resident and registrar teaching sessions. It is also involved in conducting the FRACP clinical examinations which are held every year during July/August. There is a weekly teleconference of echocardiography teaching with participation of a number of hospitals in Queensland. The hospital's echocardiography department organises the Echo Australia conference which is held once a year and has developed several innovative techniques related to Numerical Modeling in Echocardiography such as ePLAR (The echocardiographic Pulmonary to Left Atrial Ratio) and The Relative Atrial Index (RAI).

For children's health, there is a paediatric emergency department,  short stay paediatric unit and some paediatric outpatient services.

References

External links

 
 

Hospitals in Brisbane
Teaching hospitals in Australia
Hospitals established in 1954